Quakers Friars is a historic building in Broadmead, Bristol, England.

The site is the remains of a Dominican friary, Blackfriars that was established by Maurice de Gaunt, c. 1227. Llywelyn ap Dafydd the eldest son and heir of Dafydd ap Gruffudd (Prince of Wales 1282–1283) was buried here in 1287. He had died while imprisoned at nearby Bristol Castle where he had been confined since 1283.

The friends meeting house was built in 1747–1749 by George Tully, with detailing by Thomas Paty, as a Quaker meeting house.

The building has recently been used as a register office, before being renovated as part of the Cabot Circus development. As of October 2020, the Quakers Friars houses a German-themed restaurant called Klosterhaus.

It has been designated by Historic England as a grade I listed building.

William Penn was married, 1696, in an earlier building on the site.

It is a Scheduled Ancient Monument.

References

See also
 Grade I listed buildings in Bristol

Churches completed in 1749
Grade I listed churches in Bristol

Scheduled monuments in Bristol
Quaker meeting houses in England
Former churches in Bristol
18th-century Quaker meeting houses